The discography of Death consists of seven studio albums and four live albums. Death was an American death metal band formed in 1983. The band's founder, Chuck Schuldiner, is considered "a pioneering force in death metal".  The band ceased to exist after Schuldiner died of brain cancer in 2001, though it remains an enduring death metal legacy.

, Death had sold over 2 million albums worldwide, with over 500,000 copies sold by December 2009 in the U.S. alone (excluding the numerous sales before the SoundScan era) making them the top-selling death metal band worldwide, and only topped in the U.S. by Cannibal Corpse.

Studio albums

Live albums

Compilation albums

Demo albums
Prior to the release of the band's debut album in 1987, Death released many demos and rehearsal tapes. Below is a list of the band's official demos according to its website.
 Rehearsal tape -1- (rehearsal tape as Mantas, 1984)
 Rehearsal tape -2- (rehearsal tape as Mantas, 1984)
 Rehearsal tape -3- (rehearsal tape as Mantas, 1984)
 Live tape -1- (live, demo as Mantas, 1984)
 Live tape -2- (live, demo as Mantas, 1984)
 Live tape -3- (live, demo as Mantas, 1984)
 Live tape -4- (live, demo as Mantas, 1984)
 Live tape -5-   (live, demo as Mantas, 1984)
 Death by Metal (demo as Mantas, 1984)
 Reign of Terror (demo, 1984)
 Rehearsal tape -4- (rehearsal tape, 1985)
 Rehearsal tape -5- (rehearsal tape, 1985)
 Rehearsal tape -6- (rehearsal tape, 1985)
 Rehearsal tape -7- (rehearsal tape, 1985)
 Rehearsal tape -8- (rehearsal tape, 1985)
 Rehearsal tape -9- (rehearsal tape, 1985)
 Rehearsal tape -10- (rehearsal tape, 1985)
 Rehearsal tape -11- (rehearsal tape, 1985)
 Live tape -6- (live demo, 1985)
 Live tape -7- (live demo, 1985)
 Live tape -8- (live demo, 1985)
 Infernal Death (demo, 1985)
 Rigor Mortis (demo, 1985)
 Back From The Dead (demo, 1985)
 Rehearsal tape -12- (live demo 1986)
 Mutilation (demo, 1986)

Singles

Video albums
 Live in Combat Ultimate Revenge 2 (1988)
 Live in Houston (Bootleg, VHS, 04.02.1989)
 Lack of Comprehension (videoclip, 1991)
 The Philosopher (videoclip, 1993)
 Live in Florence (VHS, 10.12.1993)
 Live in Cottbus '98 (1998, Official Bootleg)
 Live in L.A. (Death & Raw) (Official Live, DVD/VHS, 05.12.1998)
 Live in Music Hall (1998, Virus Cable TV)
 Live in Eindhoven (Official Live, DVD, 2001, Nuclear Blast)

Music videos
 "Lack of Comprehension" (1991)
 "The Philosopher" (1993)

References

External links

Discographies of American artists
Heavy metal group discographies